The fork-tailed tody-tyrant or fork-tailed pygmy tyrant (Hemitriccus furcatus) is a species of bird in the family Tyrannidae. It is endemic to Brazil. Its natural habitats are subtropical or tropical moist lowland forest and subtropical or tropical moist montane forest. It is threatened by habitat loss.

References

External links

BirdLife Species Factsheet.

Hemitriccus
Birds of the Atlantic Forest
Endemic birds of Brazil
Birds described in 1846
Taxonomy articles created by Polbot